Monisha Arshak is an Indian television actress known for her works in Malayalam and Tamil television industry. She made her television debut through Manjurukum Kaalam.

Early life
Monisha was born on 19 September 1990 at Sultan Bathery, Wayanad to P.K Shaji and Indira. She did her schooling in Thripunithura Sanskrit higher secondary school, Ernakulam and acquired her degree in BEd from Malabar Christian College, Calicut and St. Teresa's College, Ernakulam. She has two brothers Midhun Shah and Manek Shah. In 2018, she married Arshak Nath.

Filmography

Films

Television 
TV serials

TV shows

References

External links
 

1990 births
Living people
Malayali people
Actresses from Kerala
Indian soap opera actresses
21st-century Indian actresses
Actresses in Malayalam television
Actresses in Tamil television
Actresses in Malayalam cinema
Actresses in Telugu television